Stein Slyngstad (born 25 November 1960) is a Norwegian cultural administrator.

He hails from Skui, and holds a siv.øk. degree. He was the director of the Stavanger Symphony Orchestra and the Stavanger Konserthus 1992 to 1997, manager of the Henie-Onstad Art Centre 1997 to 2001, director of the Norwegian Film Fund from 2001 to 2008 and the Norwegian Archive, Library and Museum Authority since 2009. When the authority was discontinued on 1 January 2011, he continued in the Arts Council Norway.

References

1960 births
Living people
Directors of government agencies of Norway
People from Bærum